Kevin Volans: Hunting:Gathering is a studio album by the Kronos Quartet, containing works by South African composer Kevin Volans composed especially for the quartet.

Track listing

Critical reception
The New York Times called Hunting:Gathering "a work that moves freely among African rhythmic and melodic shapes, contemporary Western harmonies and tone-shaping techniques, and distorted glimpses of Haydnesque Classicism."

Credits

Musicians
David Harrington – violin
John Sherba – violin
Hank Dutt – viola
Joan Jeanrenaud – cello

Production
Recorded at Skywalker Sound, Nicasio, California
Judith Sherman, Juhani Liimatainen, and Tony Eckert – engineers

See also
List of 1993 albums

References 

1993 albums
Kronos Quartet albums
Nonesuch Records albums